Padawala is a village in Padiyathalawa Divisional Secretariat, Ampara District, Eastern Province, Sri Lanka.

References 

Villages in Ampara District
Padiyathalawa DS Division